Beggin' After Dark is the second studio album by American R&B group H-Town, released November 8, 1994, on Luke Records. The album showcases a more sensual romantic sound on ballads such as "Much Feelin' (And It Tastes Great)", "One Night Gigolo", "Full Time", and "Baby I Love Ya" featuring Roger Troutman.The first single Back Seat (Wit No Sheets)" peaked at #18 while the album's second single "Emotions" peaked at #11 on Billboard's Top R&B Songs chart.

Track listing 
 "H-Town Intro '94" (Bishop "Stick" Burrell) - 2:31
 "Sex Bowl" (Keven "Dino" Conner, Solomon "Shazam" Conner, Bishop "Stick" Burrell) - 5:13
 "One Night Gigolo" (Keven "Dino" Conner, Solomon "Shazam" Conner, Bishop "Stick" Burrell) - 5:29
 "Prelude to Emotion" (Keven "Dino" Conner, Darryl "G.I." Jackson, Solomon "Shazam" Conner) - 1:36
 "Emotions" (Keven "Dino" Conner, Darryl "G.I." Jackson, Solomon "Shazam" Conner) - 5:57
 "Cruisin' fo' Honeys" (Keven "Dino" Conner, Mark "G.I." Jackson, Solomon "Shazam" Conner, Bishop "Stick" Burrell) - 2:21
 "Full Time" (Keven "Dino" Conner, Darryl "G.I." Jackson, Solomon "Shazam" Conner) - 5:21
 "1-900-CALL GI" (Darryl "G.I." Jackson) - 1:34
 "Tumble & Rumble" (Keven "Dino" Conner, Solomon "Shazam" Conner, Bishop "Stick" Burrell) - 6:02
 "Much Feelin' (And It Tastes Great)" (Keven "Dino" Conner, Solomon "Shazam" Conner, Bishop "Stick" Burrell) - 5:23
 "Beggin' After Dark" (Bishop "Stick" Burrell) - 1:46
 "Indo Love" (Keven "Dino" Conner, Solomon "Shazam" Conner, Bishop "Stick" Burrell) - 4:45
 "Back Seat (Wit No Sheets)" (Keven "Dino" Conner, Solomon "Shazam" Conner, Bishop "Stick" Burrell) - 4:45
 "Buss One" (featuring Papa Reu) (Keven "Dino" Conner, Darryl "G.I." Jackson, Papi Reu, Solomon "Shazam" Conner) - 5:43
 "Baby I Love Ya'" (featuring Roger Troutman) (Keven "Dino" Conner, Darryl "G.I." Jackson, Roger Troutman, Solomon "Shazam" Conner, Bishop "Stick" Burrell) - 5:51 
 "Sticky Lee Presley" (Bishop "Stick" Burrell) - 0:22
 "Rockit Steady" (Keven "Dino" Conner, Darryl "G.I." Jackson, Solomon "Shazam" Conner) - 4:30
 "The Last Record" (Bishop "Stick" Burrell) - 3:20

Source

Personnel
Arranged By – Keven "Dino" Conner (tracks: 4 to 6, 9, 17)
Arranged By, Mixed By – Bishop "Stick" Burrell (tracks: 1 to 4, 6 to 16, 18)
Keyboard – Keven "Dino" Conner, Darryl "G.I." Jackson
Guitar – Ron Johnson (tracks: 1, 9, 13, 17)
Guitar – Carl Johnson tracks: 12)
Engineer [Recording] – Bishop "Stick" Burrell, Brian "Bad Ass" Conner, Mike Vaughn 
Executive-Producer – Luther R. Campbell
Mastered By – Mike Fuller
Producer – Bishop "Stick" Burrell (tracks: 1 to 5, 6 to 16, 18), Keven "Dino" Conner (tracks: 5 to 7, 9, 17)

Credits from album liner notes

Charts

Weekly charts

Year-end charts

Singles

Certifications

References

External links
Beggin' After Dark (CD, Album) - Discogs
Beggin' After Dark - Amazon

1994 albums
H-Town (band) albums